Sofi Tsedaka (born ), also known by her post-conversion name Sofi Sarah, is an Israeli actress, singer, television presenter and politician.

Born into a Samaritan family in the city of Holon, Israel, Tsedaka formally converted to Judaism along with her sisters at the age of 18. She has acted and sung on various television shows and children's video cassettes throughout her career and has also released several musical singles on Israeli radio. Tsedaka voiced the character Ella of Frell (played by Anne Hathaway) in the Hebrew-language dub of the 2004 film Ella Enchanted. In 2017, Tsedaka produced a documentary about leaving the Samaritan community and converting to Judaism. She has released a CD titled Barashet, which is the Samaritan-language rendering of the Biblical Hebrew word for the Book of Genesis, containing the first few verses of the Samaritan Pentateuch.

Political career 
In the 2006 Israeli legislative elections for the 17th Knesset, Tsedaka stood for The Greens party, but was not elected.

Personal life 
Following the completion of the process of her formal conversion to Judaism in 1997, Tsedaka married Roni Azran, a Jewish Israeli man; they divorced in 2002. She has a daughter and a son, born in 1997 and 2011, respectively.

References

External links

1975 births
Living people
Israeli Jews
Converts to Judaism
Israeli television actresses
People from Holon
Samaritans
Israeli musicians
Israeli voice actresses